Isabel Jones may refer to:

 Isabel Jean Jones (?–2008), English-born South African consumer journalist
 Isabel Jones (bowls) (born 1955), Welsh lawn bowls player